Pseudobagrus omeihensis is a species of fish classified into the family Bagridae, included at order Siluriformes.

Distribution
The fish lives in the region of O-mei Hsien, China.

References

Bibliography
 Eschmeyer, William N., ed. 1998. Catalog of Fishes. Special Publication of the Center for Biodiversity Research and Information, núm. 1, vol. 1–3. California Academy of Sciences. San Francisco, California, Estados Unidos. 2905. .
 Fenner, Robert M.: The Conscientious Marine Aquarist. Neptune City, Nueva Jersey, Estados Unidos : T.F.H. Publications, 2001.
 Helfman, G., B. Collette y D. Facey: The diversity of fishes. Blackwell Science, Malden, Massachusetts, Estados Unidos , 1997.
 Moyle, P. y J. Cech.: Fishes: An Introduction to Ichthyology, 4a. edición, Upper Saddle River, Nueva Jersey, Estados Unidos: Prentice-Hall. Año 2000.
 Nelson, J.: Fishes of the World, 3a. edición. Nueva York, Estados Unidos: John Wiley and Sons. Año 1994.
 Wheeler, A.: The World Encyclopedia of Fishes, 2a. edición, Londres: Macdonald. Año 1985.

External links
  Aquatab.net

omeihensis
Fish of China